James Michael Rowe (born 21 October 1991) is an English footballer who plays as an attacking midfielder for Aldershot Town.

Career 
Born in Oxford, Rowe began his career in the Academy at Southampton before joining Reading, where after two years in the under-18 squad, he was handed a first year professional contract. Whilst at Reading he spent time on loan at Basingstoke Town in 2009 and Lewes in 2011.

He left Reading without making a senior appearance and joined Forest Green Rovers on trial in the summer of 2011. He scored in pre-season friendlies against Hereford United and Cirencester Town and earned a two-year deal with the club. He made his Forest Green debut on the opening day of the 2011–12 Conference Premier season against Stockport County. He left Forest Green in April 2013 after two seasons with the club.

He joined League One side Tranmere Rovers on trial in July 2013 and earned a one-year contract. He made his debut in a League Cup first round tie with Mansfield Town on 6 August and scored his first goal in professional football with the winner in Tranmere's 3–2 win over MK Dons in October. On 2 May 2014, it was announced that he had signed a new one-year contract to stay with Tranmere for another season.

Rowe's 90th-minute equaliser on the opening day of the 2014–15 season earned Tranmere a 1–1 draw with York City as he scored second professional goal. He fell out of favour after sixth game of the season and missed two months before coming back with a winning goal against Portsmouth on 29 November.

Rowe was released by Tranmere by mutual consent on 2 February 2015.

On 5 August 2015 Cheltenham Town manager Gary Johnson confirmed that Rowe would join the club for the 2015–16 season.

On 31 July 2017 Gary Waddock signed Rowe after a successful trial to Aldershot Town on a one-year contract. Despite being released by Aldershot at the end of the 2017–18 season, Rowe was given the opportunity to re-trial with the Hampshire-based side and subsequently signed a new one-year deal in July 2018.

Career statistics

Honours

Cheltenham Town
Vanarama National League Winners: 2015-16

References

External links 

1991 births
Living people
Footballers from Oxford
English footballers
Association football midfielders
Southampton F.C. players
Reading F.C. players
Basingstoke Town F.C. players
Lewes F.C. players
Forest Green Rovers F.C. players
Tranmere Rovers F.C. players
Cheltenham Town F.C. players
English Football League players
National League (English football) players
Aldershot Town F.C. players